The eleventh season of the reality/sports competition series American Ninja Warrior premiered on May 29, 2019, on NBC. City qualifying and finals competitions were held in Los Angeles, Atlanta, Oklahoma City, Seattle/Tacoma, marking the first time a course was held in the Pacific Northwest, Baltimore, and Cincinnati.

The course returns with new twists in the qualifying rounds, including changes to the Mega Wall, and a new reward competition, the Power Tower. Matt Iseman and Akbar Gbaja-Biamila returned for their respective tenth and seventh seasons while newcomer Zuri Hall joined the duo as a sideline reporter, replacing Kristine Leahy. Season 7 course finisher and "Total Victory" achiever Geoff Britten participated, marking his return to competition in the series but fell in Seattle/Tacoma Qualifying, marking the end of his season.

Drew Drechsel won and became the third person to achieve "Total Victory" on American Ninja Warrior. He was arrested almost a year later on August 4, 2020 following accusations of federal child sex-related charges, with NBC and A. Smith & Co. Productions subsequently cutting ties with him the following day.  Because of federal game show regulations, his prize money is held in escrow awaiting the results of the trial.

Competition schedule

Obstacles
  Indicates obstacles created by fans for the "American Ninja Warrior Obstacle Design Challenge".

A new obstacle, the Power Tower, was also introduced. In the city qualifiers, the two fastest finalists from each course competed against each other for a "speed pass" that immediately advances the recipient to the National Finals. In the city finals courses, the Power Tower offered a "safety pass" that allows the recipient a second chance to complete Stage 1 or 2 of the National Finals. Most of the ninjas had to play their Safety Passes from the City Finals with 2 using it on Stage 1 (Drew Drechsel and Flip Rodriguez) and the other 3 using it on Stage 2 (Dave Cavanagh, Mathis 'Kid' Owhadi, and Karson Voiles). The only ninja who didn't play it was Michael Torres because he finished Stage 1 and 2 and it is not allowed to be used on Stage 3. The only ninjas who played it but failed to advance to Stage 3 were Flip Rodriguez, who timed out on the Water Walls after using it on Stage 1 when he fell on the Diving Boards, and Dave Cavanagh, who fell twice on Stage 2, first on Giant Walk the Plank, and then on the Extension Ladder.

Mega Wall changes
The Mega Wall, introduced in the tenth season, returns with new rules. Contestants must now choose which version to attempt—the 14.5-foot Warped Wall or the 18-foot Mega Wall—and cannot change once they have attempted one or the other. In addition, contestants are now allowed three attempts at the Mega Wall, and can win cash on any of them: $10,000 for scaling it on the first try, $5,000 on the second, or $2,500 on the third.

Power Tower
A new obstacle, the Power Tower, was also introduced. In the city qualifiers, the two fastest finalists from each course competed against each other for a "speed pass" that immediately advances the recipient to the National Finals. In the city finals courses, the Power Tower offered a "safety pass" that allows the recipient a second chance to complete Stage 1 or 2 of the National Finals. All the other ninjas with 2 using it on Stage 1 (Drew Dreschel and Flip Rodriguez) and the other 3 (Dave Cavanagh, Mathis 'Kid' Owahdi, and Karson Voiles) having to play their Safety Passes from the City Finals but the only one out of the six who didn't play it was Micheal Torres because he finished Stage 1 and 2 and you can't use it on Stage 3.

City Qualifying & Finals

National Finals

City courses

Bold denotes the finishers who completed the Mega Wall and received a prize money bonus ($10,000, $5,000, or $2,500 based on number of attempts).

Italics denote the Top 5 women who also finished in the overall Top 30 and the Top 2 women who also finished in the overall Top 12.

Underline represents the contestant who won the Speed Pass on the Power Tower in qualifying.

 represents the contestant who won the Safety Pass on the Power Tower in the finals.

City Qualifying

Los Angeles

Qualifying
The Los Angeles qualifiers featured two new obstacles, Walk The Plank and Spring Forward. The course took place on the backlot of Obstacle Academy. The Los Angeles Clippers cheerleaders along with mascot "Chuck the Condor" who were firing up and handing out t-shirts to the crowd. Former NBA player Kareem Rush ran the course as 10-time NBA all-star Paul Pierce cheered him on. Gymnast Danell Leyva, a US champion and 3-time Olympic medalist, completed the course.

Finals
The Los Angeles finals had 1 new obstacle, Leaps of Faith. Starting this season, only the Top 12 competitors in each city would move on to the National Finals. In Los Angeles, a total of 15 competitors moved on to the National Finals, as the Top 12 contestants, the Top 2 Women, and Hunter Guerard, the Speed Pass winner in qualifying, advanced. The Los Angeles Chargers cheerleaders and "Thunderbolt" Drumline along with Sean Culkin were in the crowd cheering on the competitors and pro football player Anthony Trucks who ran the course.

Atlanta

Qualifying
In a tie-in with the 2019 movie The Secret Life of Pets 2, the course had a theme inspired by the movie. A preview also aired during the episode. Additionally, after his run, lab technician Andrew "Roo" Yori was awarded a $20,000 check from the creators of the film for his nonprofit organization, The Wallace The Pitbull Foundation. The Atlanta qualifiers featured two new obstacles, Off The Hook and the Ferris Wheel. The competition took place outside Mercedes-Benz Stadium, home of the Atlanta Falcons; their cheerleaders and mascot Freddie Falcon were in attendance to cheer on competitors. Celebrity competitors included former NFL cornerback and two-time Super Bowl champion Tyrone Poole who made it to the Ferris Wheel obstacle, and World Series of Poker player Tony Miles who only made it to the third obstacle, thus losing the bet his friend put on him to hit the buzzer at 25:1 odds.

Finals
The Atlanta Finals will feature 1 new obstacle, Up For Grabs. 15 contestants advanced to the National Finals from this region, as 13 competitors automatically advanced, as Drew Drechsel, who was in the Top 12, won the Speed Pass in qualifying, along with making it up the Mega Wall and now winning the Safety Pass, making ANW history by completing this trifecta. The Top 2 Women also advanced to the National Finals, as Caitlyn Bergstrom, along with her brother Caleb Bergstrom, also made ANW history, becoming the first brother/sister duo to both qualify for the National Finals, after making history by becoming the first brother/sister duo to qualify for the city finals in qualifying.

Oklahoma City

Qualifying
The Oklahoma City qualifiers featured three new obstacles, the Wing Swing, the Diving Boards and the Coconut Climb. In attendance hyping up the crowd was the Oklahoma City Thunder cheerleaders and drum line, along with mascot Rumble the Bison. Also, the Oklahoma State University cheerleaders and school mascot Pistol Pete helped cheer on the competitors. The ninja course was held just outside the Oklahoma State Capitol. Former Kansas State legislator Kevin Jones improved his performance from last year by making it to the second obstacle.

Finals

The Oklahoma City finals introduced a new obstacle, Snap Back. In attendance among the crowd was Boomer, one of the mascots from the University of Oklahoma. A record for the most women to make it up the Warped Wall during a city finals round was set, as four women made it up the 14 1/2-foot Warped Wall, including Karen Wiltin who was the third mom to make it up the Warped Wall in American Ninja Warrior history. Maggi Thorne became the second mom to make it up the wall later that night. Taylor Amann became the second female in their rookie season to automatically qualify for the national finals, following Jesse Labreck, and later Mady Howard, who achieved the feat one week later during the Seattle/Tacoma city finals.

Seattle/Tacoma

Qualifying
The Seattle/Tacoma qualifiers featured two new obstacles the Lunatic Ledges and Barrel Roll.
Taking place inside the Tacoma Dome, this was ANW first-ever indoor course. In the audience was "The 12s", Seattle Seahawks fan club, along with the Mariner Moose from the Seattle Mariners. Musician Ryan Phillips from rock band Story of the Year ran the course, making it to the fifth obstacle. Sprint car driver McKenna Haase also competed, getting to the third obstacle. U.S. Olympic decathlete Jeremy Taiwo gave the course a try, but failed on the Lightning Bolts. U.S. Olympic halfpipe skier Alex Ferreira also tried his luck on the course, only making it to the second obstacle. Former baseball player for the Mariners Ryan Rowland-Smith became the first MLB pitcher to compete, getting to the second obstacle. Also, Geoff Britten, who conquered Stage 4 in Season 7, made his return to the course. But his comeback was very short-lived as he shockingly failed on the Broken Bridge, marking the first time he fell in qualifying.

PE teacher Sandy Zimmerman, a National Judo Champion, former Gonzaga University basketball player, and mother of three, became the first mom to finish the course in the show's history. She was also the first and oldest woman (age 42) to complete the course this season, soon followed by stuntwoman Jessie Graff who returned to ANW after a year absence.

Finals

The city finals on this course introduced a new obstacle, Northwest Passage. Sean Bryan, who won the Speed Pass in qualifying, automatically qualified for the National Finals. This marked the first time in the show's history that no competitor completed the ninth obstacle on a city finals course and the third time in American Ninja Warrior history that a city finals course was uncompleted after three years ago in Philadelphia and two years ago in Kansas City as the Lightning Bolts and Floating Monkey Bars took out over 80% of the competitors, leaving very few competitors who made it to the ninth obstacle.

Present to entertain the audience was Blue Thunder, the Seattle Seahawks' drumline.

Baltimore

Qualifying
The Baltimore qualifiers featured two new obstacles, the Dangerous Curves and the Hazard Cones. The course took place on Baltimore's Inner Harbor. Among the audience cheering on the competitors was the Baltimore Orioles' mascot, "The Oriole Bird", along with the University of Maryland cheerleaders and the Maryland Terrapins mascot, Testudo. Former WNBA player Tamika Catchings of the Indiana Fever competed on the course, making it to the Dangerous Curves, the third obstacle.

Finals
The Baltimore Finals featured one new obstacle, Angry Birds (which was done in promotion for The Angry Birds Movie 2). It took out 22 competitors, and nobody cleared it. This marked the first time in American Ninja Warrior history that no competitor made it past the eighth obstacle on a city finals course. This was also the first time in history that two city finals courses in one season concluded without any finishers, and the fourth time that a city finals course was unfinished after three years ago in Philadelphia, two years ago in Kansas City, and last week in Seattle/Tacoma. Dave Cavanagh became only the second competitor to win both the Speed Pass and the Safety Pass after Drew Drechsel in Atlanta.

Along with the Oriole Bird, the cheering section included the Baltimore Ravens cheerleaders and the team's mascot, Poe.

Cincinnati

Qualifying
The Cincinnati Qualifiers featured one new obstacle, the Slingshot. Among the crowd was Cincinnati Bengals quarterback Andy Dalton along with the team's cheerleading squad, the Cincinnati Ben–Gals, and the team's mascot, Who Dey. Also in the crowd were the Cincinnati Reds mascots, Mr. Red, Mr. Redlegs, and Rosie Red. Drew Lachey of the boy band 98 Degrees was among the celebrities who attempted this course.

Finals

The Cincinnati finals featured one new obstacle, Slam Dunk. In addition to the three Cincinnati Reds mascots, the University of Cincinnati cheerleaders, marching band, and university mascot Bearcat were on hand in the cheering section. This episode also featured a special guest appearance by legendary funk musician and Cincinnati native Bootsy Collins, who accompanied Grant McCartney to the starting line.

For the first time since the Dallas Finals in season 6, a woman completed the entire city finals course. The feat was accomplished by two women: Michelle Warnky and Jesse "Flex" Labreck.

City Qualifying Leaderboard

Bold denotes the finishers who completed the Mega Wall and received a prize money bonus ($10,000, $5,000, or $2,500 based on number of attempts).

Italics denote the Top 5 women who also finished in the overall Top 30.

Underline represents the contestant who won the Speed Pass on the Power Tower.

City Finals Leaderboard

Italics denote the Top 2 women who also finished in the overall Top 13.

Underline represents the contestant who won the Speed Pass on the Power Tower in qualifying.

 represents the contestant who won the Safety Pass on the Power Tower.

National Finals

Stage 1

Stage 1 featured one new obstacle, Spin Your Wheels.

NOTE:  Drew Drechsel failed on the fifth obstacle, Tire Run, and used his Safety Pass from winning his regional to retry the course a second time, as did Flip Rodriguez on the seventh obstacle on Stage 1, the Diving Boards. Both completed the course on their 2nd attempt.

NOTE: For the second season in a row no women completed Stage 1.

Stage 2
Stage 2 featured three new obstacles, Giant Walk the Plank, the Extension Salmon Ladder and the Grim Sweeper. A record-number 21 competitors completed Stage 2. 

NOTE: Kid Owhadi failed on the Grim Sweeper (the fifth obstacle) and used his Safety Pass to retry and finish the course. Karson Voiles failed on Snap Back (the third obstacle) and also used his safety pass to retry and finish the course. Dave Cavanagh failed on Giant Walk the Plank and used the Safety Pass, but fell again on the Extension Ladder, so he was the only Ninja who had played the Safety Pass on Stage 2 to not move on to Stage 3.

Stage 3
Stage 3 featured three new obstacles, Grip & Tip, Iron Summit and Pipe Dream.

Leaderboard

Stage 4

Drew Dreschel becomes the third American Ninja Warrior. Dreschel also became the first athlete to hit six buzzers and have a Speed Pass and Safety Pass.

Ratings

References

American Ninja Warrior
2019 American television seasons